David Weisberg is an American screenwriter, best known for writing 1996 film The Rock, which he co-wrote with his writing partner Douglas Cook, who died on July 19, 2015. His other credits with Cook include Payoff, Holy Matrimony, Double Jeopardy and Criminal. They also wrote another action thriller script Blank Slate, which is currently un-produced at Bold Films.

Filmography 
 Payoff (1991, TV film)
 Holy Matrimony (1994)
 The Rock (1996)
 Double Jeopardy (1999)
 Criminal (2016)

References

External links 
 

Living people
Year of birth missing (living people)
American male screenwriters